Descent may refer to:

As a noun

Genealogy and inheritance
 Common descent, concept in evolutionary biology
 Kinship, one of the major concepts of cultural anthropology
Pedigree chart or family tree
Ancestry
Lineal descendant
Heritage
Royal descent - lineal descent from a monarch
Phylogenetics
Tree diagram (disambiguation)
Inheritance  (law and property)

Mathematics
 Infinite descent, a method going back to Fermat to solve Diophantine equations
 Descent (mathematics), an idea extending the notion of "gluing" in topology
 Hadamard's method of descent, a technique for solving partial differential equations
 Gradient descent, a first-order optimization algorithm going back to Newton
 Descents in permutations, a classical permutation statistic in combinatorics

Other uses
Descent (aeronautics), the decrease of an aircraft in altitude during flight
Descent (font), the distance that a typeface descends below the baseline in typography
Katabasis

As a proper name

Film
 The Descent, a 2005 horror film
 The Descent Part 2, the 2009 sequel to the 2005 film
 Descent (2007 film), a thriller film starring Rosario Dawson
 Descent (2017 film), a Nigerian film

Gaming
 Descent (video game), first in a series from Interplay Entertainment and Parallax Software
 Descent II, sequel to Descent
 Descent 3, sequel to Descent II
 Descent: FreeSpace – The Great War, a 1998 space combat simulation computer game
 Descent: Journeys in the Dark, a 2005 board game by Fantasy Flight Games
 Dragon Age: Inquisition – The Descent, a 2015 downloadable content pack for Dragon Age: Inquisition

Literature
 Descent: An Irresistible Tragicomedy of Everyday Life, a 2004 novel by Sabrina Broadbent
 The Descent (novel), by Jeff Long
 Descent (magazine), a magazine about caving
 Descent (journal), a genealogy journal published by the Society of Australian Genealogists

Music
 Descent, an album by the band This Burning Effigy
 "Descent" (song), a song by Fear Factory from Obsolete
 "Descent", a song by Godflesh from Us and Them
 "Descent", a song by Knut from Bastardiser
 "Descent", a song by Neurosis from Times of Grace
 "A Descent", a song by Born of Osiris from A Higher Place
 "The Descent", a song by Polaris from The Death of Me

Television
 "Descent" (Star Trek: The Next Generation), a two-part 1993 episode of Star Trek: The Next Generation
 "Descent" (The Outer Limits), a 1999 episode of The Outer Limits
 "Descent" (Stargate SG-1), a 2002 episode of Stargate SG-1
 "The Descent" (The Vampire Diaries), a 2011 episode of The Vampire Diaries
 "Descent", a 2013 episode of NCIS: Los Angeles

See also
 Dissent (homophone)